Freedman v. Maryland, 380 U.S. 51 (1965), was a United States Supreme Court case that ended government-operated rating boards with a decision that a rating board could only approve a film and had no power to ban a film. The ruling also concluded that a rating board must either approve a film within a reasonable time, or go to court to stop a film from being shown in theatres. Other court cases determined that television stations are federally licensed, so local rating boards have no jurisdiction over films shown on television. When the movie industry set up its own rating system—the Motion Picture Association of America—most state and local boards ceased operating.

Background 
Ronald Freedman challenged the law of Maryland that films must be submitted to the Maryland State Board of Censors before being shown in theaters, claiming it unconstitutional; violating freedom of expression granted by the First Amendment.

Opinion of the Court 
In a unanimous opinion by Justice Brennan, the Court held that a rating board could only approve a film and had no power to ban a film.

See also

 Film censorship in the United States
 Production Code
 Joseph Burstyn, Inc v. Wilson

References

Further reading

External links
 

United States Supreme Court cases
United States Supreme Court cases of the Warren Court
United States Free Speech Clause case law
United States obscenity case law
1965 in United States case law
Film censorship in the United States
Legal history of Maryland